Potassium channel subfamily K member 18 (KCNK18), also known as TWIK-related spinal cord potassium channel (TRESK) or K2P18.1 is a protein that in humans is encoded by the KCNK18 gene. K2P18.1 is a potassium channel containing two pore-forming P domains.

A flaw in this gene could help trigger migraine headaches. If the gene does not work properly, environmental factors can more easily trigger pain centres in the brain and cause a severe headache.

See also
 Tandem pore domain potassium channel

References

Further reading

External links 
 

Ion channels